The following elections occurred in 1966.
 1966 Indialection
 1966 Fianna Fáil leadership election
 1966 Finnish parliamentary election
 1966 Gambian general election
 1966 Guatemalan general election
 1966 Maltese general election
 1966 Salvadoran legislative election
 1966 South African general election

Africa
 Gambian general election
 Kenyan parliamentary by-elections
 Mauritanian presidential election
 South African general election

Asia
 Cambodian general election
 Indian Rajya Sabha elections
 Mongolian legislative election
 Singaporean by-elections
 South Vietnamese Constitutional Assembly election
 Soviet Union legislative election
 Turkish Senate election
 1966 Taiwan presidential election

Australia
 1966 Australian federal election
 Kooyong by-election
 Dawson by-election
 Queensland state election

Europe
 Albanian parliamentary election
 Bulgarian parliamentary election
 Danish general election
 Danish regional elections
 Faroese general election
 Fianna Fáil leadership election
 Finnish parliamentary election
 1966 Irish presidential election
 Liechtenstein general election
 1966 Maltese general election
 1966 Soviet Union legislative election
 United Kingdom general election

Austria
 1966 Austrian legislative election

Germany
 1966 Hamburg state election
 1966 North Rhine-Westphalia state election (de) 
 1966 Hesse state election (de) 
 1966 Bavarian state election (de)

United Kingdom
 1966 United Kingdom general election
 1966 Carmarthen by-election
 1966 Kingston upon Hull North by-election
 List of MPs elected in the 1966 United Kingdom general election

North America

Canada
 1966 British Columbia general election
 1966 Edmonton municipal election
 1966 Manitoba general election
 1966 Newfoundland general election
 1966 Ottawa municipal election
 1966 Prince Edward Island general election
 1966 Quebec general election
 1966 Toronto municipal election

Caribbean
 1966 Barbadian general election
 Dominican general election
 Dominican Republic general election
 Montserratian general election
 Saint Kitts-Nevis-Anguilla general election
 1966 Trinidad and Tobago general election
 Saint Vincent and the Grenadines: general election

United States
 1966 United States Senate elections
 1966 Arkansas gubernatorial election
 United States House of Representatives elections in California, 1966
 1966 California gubernatorial election
 1966 Maine gubernatorial election
 1966 Minnesota gubernatorial election
 United States House of Representatives elections in South Carolina, 1966
 1966 South Carolina gubernatorial election
 1966 United States House of Representatives elections

United States gubernatorial
 1966 Oregon gubernatorial election

Arkansas
 1966 Arkansas gubernatorial election

Illinois
 United States Senate election in Illinois, 1966

Maryland
 1966 Maryland gubernatorial election

Massachusetts
 1966 Massachusetts gubernatorial election
 United States Senate election in Massachusetts, 1966

Oregon
 1966 Oregon gubernatorial election

United States Senate
 1966 United States Senate elections
 in Illinois
 in Massachusetts
 in South Carolina
 special election in South Carolina

South America  
 Bolivian general election 
 Brazilian legislative election
 Brazilian presidential election
 Colombian presidential election
 Ecuadorian Constitutional Assembly election
 Uruguayan general election

Oceania
 1966 Fijian general election
 1966 New Zealand general election

See also
 List of state leaders in 1966

 
1966
Elections